The Trans-Israel pipeline, also  Tipline, Eilat–Ashkelon Pipeline, or Europe–Asia Pipeline is an oil pipeline in Israel extending from the Gulf of Aqaba on the Red Sea to the Mediterranean Sea. It was originally built to transport crude oil originating from Iran inside Israel and to Europe.

The pipeline is owned and operated by the Eilat Ashkelon Pipeline Company (EAPC) which also operates several other oil pipelines in Israel.

History
The pipeline was built in 1968 as a 50/50% joint-venture between Israel and Iran. However, Iran ceased using the pipeline after the overthrow of Shah Mohammad Reza Pahlavi in the Iranian Islamic Revolution of 1979 and the subsequent severing of relations between the two countries.

In 2003, Israel and Russia made an agreement to supply Asian markets with Russian oil delivered by tankers from Novorossiysk to Ashkelon and then reloaded onto tankers in Eilat for shipment to Asia. The oil would therefore flow in the opposite direction to that intended originally. This route from Europe to Asia is shorter than the traditional one around Africa and cheaper than the one via the Suez Canal.

In December 2014, a breach near the southern end of the pipeline led to a massive oil spill into the Evrona Nature Reserve.

In September 2020, a preliminary agreement was reached to transport Emirati oil from the Red Sea to the Mediterranean through the pipeline.

In May 2021, a storage tank in the Ashkelon depot of the pipeline was damaged by a rocket fired from Gaza in the 2021 Israel–Palestine crisis.

Legal claim by Iran
Following the seizure of the pipeline in 1979, Iran pursued a claim for compensation against Israel. On 27 June 2016, the Swiss Federal Tribunal decided the case in Iran's favor with an award of $1.1 billion plus interest.

See also
 Sumed pipeline

References

External links
Eilat Ashkelon Pipeline Company

1968 establishments in Israel
Oil pipelines in Israel
Iran–Israel relations